Church of the Icon of the Mother of God "Quick to Hearken" (also Lasnamäe Church) is an orthodox church in Tallinn, Estonia.

The church is dedicated to the "Quick to Hearken" icon of the Mother of God (Mary, mother of Jesus). Earlier, the icon was located in Pühtitsa Convent's Tallinn Assistant Church, but this church was closed in 1959.

The church was opened and inaugurated in June 2013 by Patriarch of Moscow and all Rus'.

References

Churches in Tallinn
Eastern Orthodox churches in Estonia